Eoghan Fitzsimons SC (born 13 June 1943) is an Irish barrister who served as Attorney General of Ireland from November 1994 to December 1994.

He served as Attorney General of Ireland from 11 November to 15 December 1994. During his tenure as Attorney General, former Taoiseach Bertie Ahern described Fitzsimons's relationship with the government and then Taoiseach Albert Reynolds as "strained". He stood as a Fianna Fáil candidate for the Dublin Clontarf constituency at the 1977 general election but was not elected.

References

 

Living people
Attorneys General of Ireland
Irish barristers
Irish Senior Counsel
1943 births